Naval Station Guam may refer to:

 Guam under its Naval Governorship (1899-1941). See History of Guam and List of governors of Guam#American Naval governors (1899–1941)
 Guam Island Naval Defensive Sea Area and Guam Island Naval Airspace Reservation (1941-1962), U.S. Navy reservations established by Executive Order over the entirety of the island. See History of Guam.
 Naval Base Guam (1944-current), the main Naval installation on Apra Harbor and its various components
 Commander Naval Forces Marianas (1944-current), responsible for U.S. Naval activities in the region, since 2009 held by the same individual as Commander, Joint Region Marianas
 Joint Region Marianas (2009-current), a U.S. Navy installation management authority for military bases in Guam and the Commonwealth of the Northern Mariana Islands
 Naval Air Station Agana (1944-1995)